Philip Louis Geier (November 3, 1876 – September 25, 1967) was an American Major League Baseball outfielder. He played during five seasons for five different teams in the major leagues between 1896 and 1904.  As a left-handed hitter, Geier played more than 2300 innings in the outfield, but also found himself playing all three infield positions of second base, third base, and shortstop.  Geier recorded the most playing time in his final major league season with the Boston BeanEaters, playing in 149 games and batting .243 in 580 at bats.

Geier left baseball after 1904 and later moved to Washington State. He died in 1967 and buried at St. Joseph Cemetery. In Trentwood, Washington.

References

External links

1876 births
1967 deaths
Major League Baseball outfielders
Philadelphia Phillies players
Cincinnati Reds players
Philadelphia Athletics players
Milwaukee Brewers (1901) players
Boston Beaneaters players
Baseball players from Washington, D.C.
Minor league baseball managers
People from Washington, D.C.
Norfolk Clams players
Norfolk Crows players
Fall River Indians players
Rochester Brownies players
Montreal Royals players
St. Paul Apostles players
St. Paul Saints (Western League) players
Indianapolis Hoosiers (minor league) players
St. Paul Saints (AA) players
Milwaukee Brewers (minor league) players
Burlington Pathfinders players
Grand Rapids Furniture Makers players
Newark Newks players
South Bend Benders players
Grand Rapids Grads players
19th-century baseball players